West Ta East (غرب به شرق) is an upcoming Afghan reality series created by Ramiz King. The premise of the series is that King and his sister Rohina, who had moved from Afghanistan to Australia as children and lived a comparatively affluent life, move back to Afghanistan in order to live and work there. West Ta East is inspired by the American reality series Keeping up with the Kardashians and The Simple Life.

In an interview with ABC News, King reported that during the production of the show, he and  members of the production team received threatening phone calls from individuals identifying themselves as Taliban.

Cast 
 Rohina
 Ramiz King
 Aryana Sayeed
 Hasib Sayed
 Humayoon Shams Khan
 Gizelle Basiri

References

External links
 

Afghan television series
Afghan reality television series